The Pakistan cricket team toured England in the 1974 season to play a three-match Test series against England. The first Test of the series was England's 500th Test match. The series was tied 0-0 with all three matches drawn. The team completed their 22-match itinerary undefeated, the first touring team to do so in England since 1948.

The team

 Intikhab Alam (captain)
 Asif Iqbal (vice-captain)
 Aftab Baloch
 Aftab Gul
 Asif Masood
 Imran Khan
 Maazullah Khan
 Majid Khan
 Mohammad Nazir
 Mushtaq Mohammad
 Naseer Malik
 Sadiq Mohammad
 Sarfraz Nawaz
 Shafiq Ahmed
 Wasim Bari
 Wasim Raja
 Zaheer Abbas

The manager was Omar Kureishi.

Test series summary

First Test

Second Test

Third Test

Prudential Trophy

1st ODI

2nd ODI

References

External sources
 CricketArchive – tour itineraries

Annual reviews
 Playfair Cricket Annual 1975
 Wisden Cricketers' Almanack 1975

Further reading
 Bill Frindall, The Wisden Book of Test Cricket 1877-1978, Wisden, 1979

1974 in English cricket
1974
International cricket competitions from 1970–71 to 1975
1974 in Pakistani cricket